Mersey (ship) may refer to:

 , a ship wrecked off Torres Strait, Australia in 1805
 , a former Nourse Line and White Star Line vessel; scrapped in 1923

Ship names